Frank Wynerth Summers (September 5, 1914 – January 26, 1993) was an associate justice of the Louisiana Supreme Court from December 12, 1960, to December 31, 1978, and chief justice from January 1, 1979, to February 29, 1980.

Early life, education, and military service
Born in Abbeville, Louisiana to Clay Ralph Summers and Esther LeBlanc, Summers attended the Abbeville public schools and received a B.A. from Southwestern Louisiana Institute in 1936, where he lettered in football and track. He received an LL.B. from Tulane University Law School in 1938 and entered the practice of law in Abbeville. A naval reservist, Summers was called to active duty to serve in the Pacific theatre of World War II, first with the Office of Naval Intelligence, and then commanding the amphibious tank-landing ship USS LST-871. His command lasted from January 15, 1945 to October 20, 1945, and Summers achieved the rank of lieutenant commander before the end of his service in November 1945. Summers thereafter returned to the practice of law.

Political activities and judicial service
Summers became increasingly active in politics, managing the successful gubernatorial campaign of Robert F. Kennon in 1952, and the failed bid of DeLesseps Story Morrison in 1960, and supporting the presidential campaign of John F. Kennedy.

From August 1952 to 1955, Summers was a judge of the Louisiana Fifteenth Judicial District Court, thereafter returning to private practice until 1960, when he ran for a seat on the Louisiana Supreme Court. In October 1960, he was elected to that seat, becoming chief justice January 1, 1979. As chief justice, he "was instrumental in transferring the Criminal Appellate Court Jurisdiction from the Supreme Court to the Appellate Court". He resigned to focus on the management of his family farm and cattle ranch.

Personal life
In June 1940, Summers married Beverly Miller, with whom he had six children. He died in his home, in Abbeville, at the age of 78.

References

1914 births
1993 deaths
People from Abbeville, Louisiana
University of Louisiana at Lafayette alumni
Tulane University Law School alumni
Justices of the Louisiana Supreme Court
20th-century American judges